Ostrawa may refer to:
Ostrawa, Lower Silesian Voivodeship, a village in south-west Poland
The Polish name for the Czech city of Ostrava